Indira Gandhi Technological and Medical Sciences University (IGTAMSU), is a private university located in Ziro, Arunachal Pradesh providing higher education in nursing, yoga, paramedical, physiotherapy, management, law. The University was established in 2012, when the Legislative Assembly of Arunachal Pradesh passed Indira Gandhi Technological And Medical Sciences University Act 2012 (Arunachal Pradesh Act No.6 of 2012). The Indira Gandhi Technological And Medical Sciences University is accredited and recognized by the University Grants Commission under the section of 2(f) of UGC Act 1956.

History
The Indira Gandhi Technological And Medical Sciences University was established under Act No.6 of 2012 passed by Arunachal Pradesh Legislative Assembly which received the assent of the Governor of Arunachal Pradesh on 26 May 2012 and was published in the Arunachal Pradesh Gazette on 30 May 2012. The University is recognized by University Grants Commission (UGC) as a Private University under section 2(f) of UGC Act 1956.

Academics
Indira Gandhi Technological And Medical Sciences University offers certificate, diploma, under graduate, post graduate diploma and post graduate programmes in engineering, management, nursing,  sports, paramedical sciences and engineering programmes.

Accreditation
Like all universities in India, IGTAMSU is recognized by the University Grants Commission (UGC). The IGTAMSU School Of Nursing is recognized by the Indian Nursing Council (INC).

References

External links
 Official website
 Official website

Universities in Arunachal Pradesh
Lower Subansiri district
Educational institutions established in 2012
2012 establishments in Arunachal Pradesh
Medical and health sciences universities in India